Bangchak Corporation Public Company Limited (BCP), previously known as Bangchak Petroleum, is a petroleum and energy conglomerate in Thailand. It was founded as a state-owned company in 1984, and is now listed on the Stock Exchange of Thailand.

History

Bang Chak Petroleum was established in accordance with a cabinet resolution of June 1984, during the Prem Tinsulanonda-led government, to operate the ailing state-owned Bangchak Refinery, as part of a restructuring project with assistance from the World Bank. Initially a state enterprise, the company ran its operations under the supervision of the finance minister. Its main missions were to refine oil and to produce petrol products for Thailand's domestic consumption.

Sophon Suphapong was the company's first president. In the 1990s, under his leadership, the company made several initiatives focused on community responsibility as well as environmental awareness, which helped Sophon win the Ramon Magsaysay Award in 1998. In April 1993, the company was listed on the Stock Exchange of Thailand (SET) under the name of The Bangchak Petroleum Public Company Limited. The company suffered heavily from the 1997 Asian financial crisis, and in 2001, the Finance Ministry reduced its shareholding percentage in Bangchak Petroleum. As a result, the company has not been a state enterprise since 1 October 2001.

The company now does business in oil refining and retail, as well as sustainable energy through various subsidiaries.

References

External links 

Oil and gas companies of Thailand
Automotive fuel retailers
Companies listed on the Stock Exchange of Thailand
Companies based in Bangkok
Thai companies established in 1984
Energy companies established in 1984